846 Lipperta is a Themistian asteroid.

Based on lightcurve studies, Lipperta has a rotation period of 1641 hours, but this figure is based on less than full coverage, so that the period may be wrong by 30 percent or so. The lack of variation in brightness could be caused by (a) very slow rotation, (b) near pole-on viewing aspect, or (c) a spherical body with uniform albedo.

References

External links 
 
 

000846
Discoveries by K. Gyllenberg
Named minor planets
000846
000846
19161126